Hussein Jasim Al-Zuhairi (died 24 November 2020) was an Iraqi politician.

Life and career
Born in Iraq, Al-Zuhairi served in the Council of Representatives of Iraq representing Diyala Governorate. He was also deputy minister of human rights and deputy minister of justice. 

He died of COVID-19 complications in Lebanon on 24 November 2020.

References

2020 deaths
Members of the Council of Representatives of Iraq
Deaths from the COVID-19 pandemic in Lebanon
Government ministers of Iraq